Piers may refer to:

 Pier, a raised structure over a body of water
 Pier (architecture), an architectural support
 Piers (name), a given name and surname (including lists of people with the name)
 Piers baronets, two titles, in the baronetages of Ireland and Nova Scotia
 Piers Island, British Columbia, Canada
 PIERS: The Port Import/Export Reporting Service, an American trade intelligence company

See also
 Pier (disambiguation)
 Pierres (disambiguation)
 Pierse
 Pierce (disambiguation)
 Peirse (disambiguation)